Tani Tani (local name for the flower Gentianella primuloides, also spelled Tanitani) is a mountain in the Andes of Peru, about  high. It is located in the Puno Region, Carabaya Province, Coasa District. Tani Tani lies west of the lake Qunchak'uchu (Quechua for "mushroom corner", Cconchacuccho, Cconchacucho).

References

Mountains of Peru
Mountains of Puno Region